Central Stadium is a multi-purpose stadium in Rechitsa, Belarus. It is mostly used for football matches and is a home stadium for Rechitsa-2014. The stadium holds 3,550 spectators.

History
The stadium was built and opened in 1925. After severe damages suffered during World War II, the stadium was rebuilt in 1944. Further renovations were performed at the stadium in 1988 and again 2007.

The stadium was originally attached to a local timber production plant was accordingly named Rechitsadrev Stadium. In 2001, the stadium became a city property and was renamed to Central Stadium.

References

External links
Stadium page at Rechitsa-2014 website (archived)

Football venues in Belarus
Buildings and structures in Gomel Region